Floyd E. Bloom (born 1936 in Minneapolis, Minnesota) is an American medical researcher specializing in chemical neuroanatomy.

He received an A.B., cum laude from Southern Methodist University in 1956 and an M.D., cum laude from the Washington University in St. Louis School of Medicine in 1960. The next two years he spent as an intern and resident at the Barnes-Jewish Hospital.

He is chairman emeritus of the Department of Neuropharmacology at The Scripps Research Institute in La Jolla, California, past president of the American Association for the Advancement of Science, former editor-in-chief of Science (1995–2000), director of Behavioral Neurobiology at the Salk Institute for Biological Studies, and chief of the Laboratory of Neuropharmacology of the National Institute of Mental Health.  In 1989, he was inducted into the Woodrow Wilson High School Hall of Fame. He is a member of the National Academy of Sciences, the American Academy of Arts and Sciences, and the American Philosophical Society.

References

Living people
American medical researchers
1936 births
Southern Methodist University alumni
Washington University School of Medicine alumni
Scripps Research faculty
Members of the United States National Academy of Sciences
Salk Institute for Biological Studies people
Members of the American Philosophical Society
Members of the Royal Swedish Academy of Sciences
Members of the National Academy of Medicine